Suzanne Whang (Korean:황보희, September 28, 1962 – September 17, 2019) was an American television host, comedian, radio host, author, minister, writer, producer, and political activist. She is best known for having been the host of the HGTV series House Hunters for nine years, and for her recurring role as manicurist Polly Chae on Las Vegas for four seasons.  Suzanne also starred as Divina the maid / wannabe actress in the Here TV sitcom From Here on OUT.

Personal life
Whang was Korean-American. Her parents were born in Seoul, South Korea. She was born in Arlington, Virginia.  She held a B.A. in psychology from Yale University and an M.Sc. degree in cognitive psychology from Brown University. As a graduate student, she conducted research with William H. Warren on visually guided action.

Whang completely recovered from stage 4 breast cancer, wrote and performed a solo show about her journey, and was writing a book about her experiences.

On October 19, 2013, Whang married long-time boyfriend Jay Nickerson at The Church of St. Paul and St. Andrew in Manhattan. The two had met decades prior, working together in theater.

Whang died on September 17, 2019, in her Los Angeles home, after a 13-year battle with cancer, eleven days shy of her 57th birthday. Her remains were later cremated.

Career
Whang hosted House Hunters from 1999 to 2007 on HGTV and had a recurring role as Polly the spa manager on NBC's drama Las Vegas. She made her television debut as a "Road Warrior" (remote correspondent) on the FX network's two-hour morning show Breakfast Time in the 1990s, and later co-hosted the network's Pet Department.

In 2002, Whang won the Best Up & Coming Comedian Award at the Las Vegas Comedy Festival, for her controversial alter ego character, Sung Hee Park.

Whang won the first annual Andy Kaufman Award at the 2004 New York Comedy Festival.

She made a guest appearance on Criminal Minds in the episode "Poison" in a brief cameo as a local TV reporter.

Since January 2011, Whang had portrayed Carol Cheng, Brenda Barrett's wedding planner and rumored to have been involved with Franco, on the TV series General Hospital.

In November 2011 Whang joined the cast of Don't Tell My Mother, a monthly storytelling event in which celebrities share true stories they'd never want their mothers to know.

Filmography

1990: A Matter of Degrees as Student
1992: HouseSitter as Moseby's Secretary
1994: Personal fX: The Collectibles Show (TV Series) as Field Host
1994: Personal fX: Breakfast Time (TV Series) as Road Warrior
1996: Personal fX: The Pet Department (TV Series) as Co-Host
1996: Fox After Breakfast as Road Warrior
1999: V.I.P (TV Series) as Diana Lu
1998: New Attitudes as Co-Host
2000: 18 Wheels of Justice as N/A
2001: The Chronicle (TV Series) as Christy Kwan
2001: NYPD Blue (TV Series) as Dr. Kim
2001: Norm as Woman #3
2002: The Practice as Foreperson
2002: Robbery Homicide Division (TV Series) as Reporter
2002: Strong Medicine (TV Series) as Dr. Sporich
2002: Seoul Mates (short) as Sung Hee Park
2003: Melvin Goes to Dinner as Extra
2003: Date or Disaster as Sock Puppet Actor
2004: The Perfect Husband: The Laci Peterson Story as Second Reporter
2004 Still Standing (TV Series) as Patron
2004: Ring of Darkness as Television Reporter
2005-2008: Las Vegas (TV Series) as Polly Nguyen
2005: Nip/Tuck as Nurse Lee
2005: Edison as Medical Examiner
2005: Constantine as Mother
2005: Two and a Half Men as Anesthesiologist
2005: Now That's Funny (video)
2005: Traci Townsend as Rosa
2005: Fresh News (video short)
2006: Brothers & Sisters (TV Series) as Carly
2006: Material Girls as TV News Anchor
2006: Cold Case (TV Series) as Mrs. Lee
2006: Without a Trace as Linda Porter
2006: Boston Legal as Juror # 1
2006: Criminal Minds (TV Series) as Reporter
2009: Un-Broke: What You Need to Know About Money as Anchorwoman
2009: Twice as Dead as Courier Person
2010: The Secret Life of the American Teenager as Fern
2011: General Hospital as Carol Cheng
2013: Arrested Development (TV Series) as Olive Garden
2014: Anger Management (TV Series) as Bank Teller
2014: From Here on OUT as Divina Sung Hee (series regular)
2014: Hell's Kitchen as Herself (dining room guest)
2015: Kingdom (TV Series) as Dr. Lynn Bennett
2016: Angel from Hell as Woman
2017: The Mick (TV Series) as Dr. Frenkel / Female Doctor
2019: For the People (TV Series) as Lori Pak

References

External links 
Official site

1962 births
2019 deaths
People from Arlington County, Virginia
American actresses of Korean descent
American women comedians
Yale College alumni
Brown University alumni
Actresses from Virginia
American television actresses
Comedians from Virginia
Deaths from breast cancer
Deaths from cancer in California
20th-century American actresses
21st-century American actresses
20th-century American comedians
21st-century American comedians